Anastasia Oleksiyivna Zarycká (born 8 January 1998) is an inactive Ukrainian-Czech tennis player who, since April 2017, starts for the Czech Republic.

Career
On the junior tour, Zarycká had a career-high ranking of No. 21, achieved in March 2016. She reached the final of the 2016 Australian Open girls' doubles competition alongside Dayana Yastremska.

On the senior tour, she has career-high WTA rankings of world No. 206 in singles, achieved on 1 July 2019, and 189 in doubles, set on 25 February 2019. Zarycká has won four singles titles and nine doubles titles on the ITF Circuit.

She made her main-draw debut on the WTA Tour at the 2017 J&T Banka Prague Open where she received a wildcard, partnering Tereza Smitková.

Private life
She was born in Prague to a Ukrainian father and a Russian mother, in April 2017 she received Czech citizenship. She started playing tennis at the age of nine, since then she has been a member of the Club Sparta Praha.

Grand Slam singles performance timeline

ITF Circuit finals

Singles: 8 (4 titles, 4 runner–ups)

Doubles: 12 (9 titles, 3 runner–ups)

References

External links
 
 

1998 births
Living people
Ukrainian female tennis players
Czech female tennis players
Tennis players from Prague
Ukrainian emigrants to the Czech Republic
Naturalized citizens of the Czech Republic
Universiade medalists in tennis
Universiade silver medalists for the Czech Republic
Medalists at the 2019 Summer Universiade
Czech people of Russian descent
Ukrainian people of Russian descent